The Joint University Programmes Admissions System, or commonly known as JUPAS, designed by Dr Gregory Chan Hin Fai, is a unified system for applying for full-time undergraduate programmes in Hong Kong. In 2017 admission, all government funded degrees and sub-degrees provided by University Grants Committee (UGC) member institutions, and most of other full-time degrees provided by institutions in Hong Kong are under the application system in JUPAS.

History
Prior to the introduction of JUPAS in 1990, the admission process of tertiary education institutes were independent of each other, and two separate entrance examinations, the Hong Kong Advanced Level Examination (HKALE) which was designed for a three years tertiary education curriculum (mainly used by University of Hong Kong), and Hong Kong Higher Level Examination (HKHLE), which was designed for a four years tertiary education curriculum (mainly used by Chinese University of Hong Kong) were provided for students. To reduce the students' pressure of dealing with two examinations and admission processes, the University Grants Committee set up the JUPAS to unite the admission processes of five of the institutions (City Polytechnic of Hong Kong, The Hong Kong Polytechnic Institute, Hong Kong Baptist University, The Chinese University of Hong Kong, and The University of Hong Kong). The UGC also selected the HKALE as the benchmark examination rather than HKHLE. The HKHLE came to its end in 1992, two years after the introduction of JUPAS.

The Hong Kong University of Science and Technology, The Hong Kong Institute of Education, and Lingnan University, institutions directly under the UGC which were established after the introduction of JUPAS, joined the scheme in 1991, 1996, and 1999, respectively.

As being an alternative of students who want to pursue their undergraduate education with a lesser result due to the high competitiveness of JUPAS (see below). All government-funded sub-degree programmes provided by JUPAS member institutes and managed under JUPAS since academic year 2000. In academic year 2006, Open University of Hong Kong, which provided self-financed degrees, also participated in the scheme. The Hong Kong Shue Yan University was also being offered to participate JUPAS, but they did not do so to maintain independency of admissions.

As part of educational reform in Hong Kong, the HKALE came to its end in 2012 (though it accepted retakers in 2013), replaced by the Hong Kong Diploma of Secondary Education (HKDSE). However, the UGC decided to keep JUPAS as their member institutions' admission procedure. In academic year 2011, they will start accepting applications for student who taking part in HKDSE.

Benchmark examinations
Since JUPAS itself is a system, not an admission examination nor process, JUPAS can collect academic results from student for the references of admissions-related personals in member institutions. Theoretically, all recognised international academic examinations involving in the world are considered in admission into JUPAS, but the Hong Kong Advanced Level Examination (HKALE), and/or the Hong Kong Diploma of Secondary Education (HKDSE, launching in academic year 2011) is a must for every student. No applicant can participate in JUPAS without a valid HKALE or HKDSE result obtained in the same or previous years in which the applicant apply for JUPAS. The aforementioned examination results are considered the most important factor of admission in all programmes in almost all situations (other than the now-defunct Early Admissions Scheme).

Even without being mentioned, before the introduction of HKDSE, the Hong Kong Certificate of Education Examination (HKCEE) was almost a must for every student since almost every student taking part in the HKALE took part in the HKCEE. HKCEE results were usually considered as an important factor in admissions, and usually were a requirement of admission in most cases. Apart from the above examinations, the two International English benchmark examinations, the TOEFL and the IELTS, play important roles in some situations (including being a minimum admission requirement), through most of the cases it is considered unessential.

Participating institutes and courses
In 2016/17 academic year, the following programmes are offered under JUPAS:
All government-funded full-time degrees/full-time degrees and sub-degree programmes (indicated with asterisk(*)) offered by University Grants Committee(UGC)-funded institutes:
City University of Hong Kong (*)
 Hong Kong Baptist University
 Lingnan University
 The Chinese University of Hong Kong
 The Education University of Hong Kong (*)
 The Hong Kong Polytechnic University (*)
 The Hong Kong University of Science and Technology
 The University of Hong Kong
Selected Self-financed full-time degrees offered by The Open University of Hong Kong
Study Subsidy Scheme for Designated Professions (SSSDP) degrees offered by following institutes:
 Caritas Institute of Higher Education
 Chu Hai College of Higher Education
 Hang Seng University of Hong Kong
 Tung Wah College
 The Open University of Hong Kong
 Hong Kong Institute of Vocational Education (including Technological and Higher Education Institute of Hong Kong)

JUPAS applicants do not need to and are not allowed to apply for any undergraduate programmes directly to the member institutions on their own as long as the programme is available by JUPAS. In such cases, JUPAS applications will always have the first priority and will void all other direct applications automatically. However, this restriction does not apply if programmes itself is not available in JUPAS.

Applications of programmes provided by institutes with no association to JUPAS (e.g. Hong Kong Shue Yan University or community colleges associated with UGC-funded institutes) are independent of the JUPAS system. Applicants of those programmes are required to apply directly to the institutes in question.

Non-Form 6 students who are not currently studying degrees provided by JUPAS, including students studying JUPAS' non-degree programmes, may apply for JUPAS as long as they met the HKDSE requirement or will participate HKDSE in same academic year to meet the requirement. Students studying in secondary schools approved by EMB can only apply for the above programmes through JUPAS.

Application process
Applicants applying through JUPAS can select up to 25 choices of any programme offered by the 9 local institutes via the online portal, provided that they satisfied the prerequisites. The application form is sub-divided into different bandings, namely band A, B, C, D & E. Putting choices in different bands will affect the scoring of the applicants in the JUPAS process, therefore putting a programme higher in their priority list will increase the chance of getting into a programme in most cases. Theoretically, the actual choice order, other than bandings, are not available to the admission related-person before the release of the admission results are released.

In 2011, the number of programme choices will be reduced from 25 to 20 for the students sitting for the HKDSE. However, students may replace up to 5 of their choices after their HKDSE results are released.

Selection process
Each and every programme offered under JUPAS will make a "Merit order list" for all its applicants based on their academic performances, interview performances and extracurricular activities. The "Merit order list" and the applicants rank list are then entered into a match-making process. The process uses eliminations so that all applicants will only get into a programme that they preferred most in their application form and which they qualify.

Note that most of the programmes only look into the applicants' academic performance when they create their "Merit order list". In most of the cases both the results of the HKALE and HKCEE are taken into account. Although performance in the HKALE is still the most important admission factor, some particular universities do count 40% or 50% or CE results in calculating student's academic performance rather than the usual 0–20%. Because of the cancellation of fine grades in both the HKCEE and HKALE, the HKCEE becomes a very important factor in deciding whether a student is admitted or not when he/she is close to the cutoff line since it is more difficult to compare student's performance with only 5 (passing) rank per subject.

In addition, some of the programmes weigh particular subjects more than others. For example, many commercial subjects double counts or even triple counts the results of HKALE Use of English and HKCEE English in calculating admission scores.

The first round admission results are traditionally released on the Wednesday before the week that the HKCEE results are announced and the whole admission process proceeds until late August, which may be only one week before some member institutions commence their first semester in their academic year.

Difficulty
Because of the high degree of difficulty of the HKALE and the fixed quota of places in universities in recent years, JUPAS was considered one of the most competitive university application schemes in the world, which media and scholars claim to be only second to the National Higher Education Entrance Examination of China. A significant large number (more than 30% since 2011) of applicants achieving the minimum Degree Programme requirement would end up not being offered by any Degree-level programmes, or even not receiving an offer, through JUPAS.

The admission rate have a drastic drop in 2012's admission, as because under 334 Scheme, most of the secondary school student can enter the Hong Kong Diploma of Secondary Education (thus eligible to apply JUPAS) make the number of admissions increase drastically. (Not every students can apply for HKALE due to HKCEE requirements for non-mature candidates.)

In comparison, between the estimated entrance rate of JUPAS and direct entries from sub-degree programmes, JUPAS has a significantly higher entrance rate. Since JUPAS is open to students not already in full-time programmes under JUPAS, this has prompted some students studying for sub-degrees to retake certain subjects to improve their chances of getting into government-funded degree programmes.

The table below shows the school candidates achieving minimum Degree Programme requirement compared with JUPAS Degree Programme intakes. The actual percentage differs slightly due to non-school HKALE/HKDSE candidates being admitted, candidates not entering their programme of Main Round Offer due to result of HKALE appeal (which made them receive a better offer), or candidates giving up their offer.

Intakes from HKALE and HKCEE (2003–2012)

Note:
Requirement and offer in above table stands for degree-level programme (including OUHK self-financed programme since 2006 intake)/requirement due to the difference of admission requirement in degree/sub-degree programmes.
The list does not include Early Admission Scheme intakes and Sub-degree Offers.

Intakes from HKDSE (born 2012)

Sub-systems
Apart from the main selection scheme, JUPAS also offers a few sub-systems and schemes for candidates who may not do well academically, but have proved qualities/needs in other areas.

Sub-system for applicants with a disability
Applicants with the following disabilities may apply through this scheme:
 Physical handicapped
 Hearing impairment
 Visual impairment
 Visceral disability
 Speech impairment
 Autism
 Mental illness

The goal of this sub-system is to allow applicants to find out as early as possible the special assistance and facilities institutions could provide to them on their admission. Applicants may receive separate offers through this sub-system.

Sub-system for school principal's nominations
Each principal of a local secondary school may nominate up to three students from his/her own school. Those students must have outstanding achievements in non-academic areas such as sports, music, social services, other cultural activities, or have demonstrated leadership abilities. The goal of this scheme is to encourage students to go beyond academics during their secondary studies.

Self recommendation scheme
This scheme is for applicants with outstanding achievements in extracurricular activities. Applicants who apply for this scheme in addition to the main scheme will be able to provide a portfolio of extracurricular activities to the institutes they applies to, so the institutes may also consider the applicants' achievements in other areas, in addition to their academic achievements. The goal for this scheme is to encourage students to participate in more extracurricular activities during their secondary studies.

Early Admissions Scheme 

Early Admissions Scheme, a subsystem of JUPAS, had been adopted between academic year of 2002/03 to 2010/11. It was tailor-made for the Secondary 6 students who achieved outstanding result in the previous HKCEE. They could skip the HKALE and get admitted to the University of Hong Kong, the Chinese University of Hong Kong or the Hong Kong University of Science and Technology after attaining certain levels in the HKCEE. Roughly about 3–5% of total JUPAS intakes had participated in this scheme until it was abolished in the academic year of 2011/12.

Footnotes

See also 
 Early Admissions Scheme
 Education in Hong Kong
 Higher education in Hong Kong
 Hong Kong Advanced Level Examination
 Hong Kong Certificate of Education Examination
 UCAS
 Matriculation

External links 
 

Education in Hong Kong